Mark Wright may refer to:

Sports
Mark Wright (footballer, born 1963), English international football player and manager
Mark Wright (footballer, born 1970), English footballer
Mark Wright (footballer, born 1981), English footballer
Mark Wright (footballer, born 1982), English footballer
Mark Wright (footballer, born 1987), English footballer (Crawley Town) and TV personality
Mark Wright (cricketer) (born 1981), English cricketer
Mark Wright (rugby league) (1955–2017), Australian rugby league player

Others
Mark Wright (entrepreneur) (born 1989), contestant on series ten of the UK version of The Apprentice
Mark Wright (British Army soldier) (1979–2006), British soldier in the Parachute Regiment and recipient of the George Cross
Mark Wright (British politician) (born 1974), Bristol, England councillor
Mark Wright (record producer) (born 1957), American record producer and songwriter
Mark Wright (TV personality) (born 1987), English television and radio presenter
Mark Peter Wright (born 1979), British artist
Mark Wright (actor), New Zealand actor
Mark Wright (Louisiana politician), member of the Louisiana House of Representatives

See also
Marc Wright (1890–1975), American pole vaulter